Abaera chalcea is a species of snout moth in the genus Abaera. It was described by George Hampson in 1897 and is known from Brazil.

References

Moths described in 1897
Chrysauginae
Moths of South America